Dicksonia sellowiana, the xaxim, or samambaiaçu or imperial samambaiaçu, is an arborescent fern in the family Dicksoniaceae, native to the tropical Americas.

Distribution
The fern is native to Southern Mexico, Central America, and South America.

In the South American Atlantic Forest biome, it is found in: Southeastern Brazil within in the states of Minas Gerais, Rio de Janeiro, São Paulo, Paraná, Santa Catarina, and Rio Grande do Sul; in northeast of Argentina within Misiones Province; and within eastern Paraguay.

Description
Due to illegal extraction, the species is at risk of extinction.

Varieties
Dicksonia sellowiana is variable in its form. Variations are sometimes treated as separate varieties, which include:
Dicksonia sellowiana var. ghiesbreghtii
Dicksonia sellowiana var. gigantea
Dicksonia sellowiana var. karsteniana
Dicksonia sellowiana var. lobulata

References

External links
 GRIN-Global Web v 1.9.8.2: Taxonomy report of Dicksonia sellowiana

Dicksoniaceae
Ferns of the Americas
Ferns of Argentina
Ferns of Brazil
Ferns of Ecuador
Ferns of Mexico
Flora of Central America
Flora of northern South America
Flora of southern South America
Flora of western South America
Flora of the Atlantic Forest
Flora of Southwestern Mexico
Flora of the Amazon
Flora of Veracruz
Neotropical realm flora
Vulnerable flora of South America
Plants described in 1844
Taxa named by William Jackson Hooker
Garden plants of Central America
Garden plants of South America